Scott McLaughlin may refer to:

 Scott McLaughlin (footballer) (born 1984), Scottish professional association footballer
 Scott McLaughlin (racing driver) (born 1993), New Zealand motor racing driver
 Scott McLaughlin (bishop), Presiding Bishop of the Orthodox Anglican Church
 Amber McLaughlin, executed transgender person and muderer who was Scott McLaughlin at the murder.